Central Baptist Church (Honolulu, HI) is a Baptist Church in the Makiki neighborhood in the city of Honolulu. It is affiliated with the Southern Baptist Convention.

History
Central Baptist Church was constituted on April 1, 1951.  In 1971, the Hawaii Baptist Academy elementary school shared a building with Central Baptist Church until it acquired and moved to the former Sacred Heart Convent in Nuuanu in 1987.

Hawaii Baptist leader, Daniel Hen Chong Kong, pastored Central Baptist Church during his last years until retiring in Dec. 2004.

From 2008 to 2017, Shane Sowers served as pastor. Nelson Chapman, served as Senior Pastor, Central Baptist Church in October 2017 until 2019. Kenneth Priest is presently serving as the Transitional Pastor during 2021.

Doctrinal Belief
On February 8, 2009, the 2000 Baptist Faith and Message was unanimously voted to replace the 1963 version as the church's articles of faith in the Church Constitution.

Notable Members
 Nelson Chapman, Senior Pastor
 Dan Kong, former pastor

References

External links
Official website

Baptist churches in Hawaii
Churches in Honolulu
1951 establishments in Hawaii
Southern Baptist Convention churches